John "Sixteen String Jack" Rann (1750 – 30 November 1774) was an English criminal and highwayman during the mid-18th century. He was a prominent and colourful local figure renowned for his wit and charm. He later came to be known as "Sixteen String Jack" for the 16 various coloured strings he wore on the knees of his silk breeches among other eccentric costumes.

Life and crimes
Born near Bath in Somerset, England, he served as a postillion to a local woman and during his teenage years worked as a coachman in London. He soon became accustomed to living beyond his means, such as wearing expensive costumes for which to attend balls and galas of the city's social circles, and was constantly in debt as a result.

He began pick-pocketing with some success, eventually stealing watches and other valuables along Hounslow Road. Soon he became a highwayman and, although he was arrested several times on charges of highway robbery, six of his cases were dismissed due to lack of evidence as witnesses were unable to identify Rann.

During one trial at Bow Street, while wearing an unusually large number of flowers in his coat and his irons decorated with blue ribbons, Rann reportedly addressed the presiding magistrate Sir John Fielding, saying "I know no more of the matter than you do or half as much" when he was asked if he had anything to say in his defence.

He was finally apprehended after robbing the chaplain of Princess Amelia near Brentford in 1774 and held in custody at Newgate Gaol, where he supposedly entertained seven women at a farewell dinner before his execution on 30 November. Shortly before he was to be hanged, appearing in a specially made pea-green suit adorned by a large nosegay, he enjoyed cheerful banter with both the hangman and the crowd, then danced a jig, before being publicly executed at Tyburn at the age of 24.

An alternative (but of unsubstantiated provenance) account of John Rann's capture and given in Julius Jottings, Nr4. relates to his employ as a coachman by one William Julius, Secretary to the then Prime Minister, the Marquis of Rockingham. Julius was renowned for his well turned-out grey carriage horses, one of which was taken by Rann to hold up the Duke of Argyll at gunpoint whilst his master was attending a London theatre. The robbery was unsuccessful and Rann's pursuit by the Duke led to his identification and subsequent conviction. The Jottings were written by the Rev Dr Churchill Julius in 1901 when he was Bishop of Christchurch, in New Zealand.

In popular culture

A play about Rann, Sixteen String Jack, was a first hit for playwright William Leman Rede in 1823.  A novel based on his life, titled Sixteen String Jack, was published in 1841.

Sixteen String Jack features prominently in the English penny dreadful Black Bess; or, The Knight of the Road by Edward Viles (1866).

The production company for the HBO television show Last Week Tonight with John Oliver is named Sixteen String Jack Productions.

Further reading
Andrews, Williams. Historic Byways and Highways of Old England. W. Andrews & Co., 1900. 
Gatrell, V. A. C. The Hanging Tree: Execution and the English People, 1770–1868. Oxford: Oxford University Press, 1996. 
Thornbury, Walter and Edward Walford. Old and New London: a narrative of its history, its people and its places. Cassell & Company, 1881.

References

External links
Roads, Tolls and Highwaymen: Travellers in 18th Century England 
A Book of Scoundrels: Chapter VIII – Gilderoy and the Sixteen String Jack, Part II Sixteen-String Jack, Part III A parallel: Gilderoy and Sixteen-String Jack

1750 births
1774 deaths
English highwaymen
18th-century English people
18th-century English criminals
People executed by the Kingdom of Great Britain
Executed people from Somerset
English criminals
People executed for robbery
People executed by England and Wales by hanging
People executed at Tyburn